The Radlin gas field in Poland was discovered in 1980. It began production in 1982 and produces natural gas. The total proven reserves of the Radlin gas field are around 390 billion cubic feet (11×109m³).

References

Natural gas fields in Poland